Tup Tup is a 1972 Yugoslav animated short by Nedeljko Dragić at Zagreb Film animation studio, in cooperation with Corona Cinematografica in Italy.

Plot
A man is trying to go to sleep but a noise keeps him up. In the process of trying to stop the noise, he exposes a bizarre mixture of sounds and images.

Accolades
It was nominated for an Academy Award for Best Animated Short Film, but lost to Richard Williams' take on A Christmas Carol.

Reception and legacy
In a 2020 poll among 38 Croatian film critics, Tup tup was ranked as the third best Croatian animated film ever, behind Dušan Vukotić's Academy Award-winning Surogat and Zdenko Gašparović's Satiemania.

References

External links
 
 Tup Tup on Dailymotion
 Tup Tup on BCDB

1972 animated films
1972 films
Croatian animated short films
Yugoslav animated short films
Zagreb Film films
Animated films without speech